Jesús Garay Vecino (10 September 1930 – 10 February 1995) was a Spanish footballer who played as a central defender.

He amassed La Liga totals of 341 games and ten goals over 16 seasons, representing mainly in the competition Athletic Bilbao (ten years) and Barcelona (five).

Garay appeared for Spain at the 1962 World Cup.

Club career
Born in Bilbao, Biscay, Garay joined local Athletic Bilbao in 1950 from neighbouring SD Erandio Club. He was immediately cast into the team's starting XI, making his La Liga debut on 8 October 1950 in a 9–4 home win over RC Celta de Vigo and scoring his first goal in the competition on 17 December of the same year also at the San Mamés Stadium, against FC Barcelona (4–3 victory).

In summer 1960, after 292 official appearances for Athletic and five major titles won, including the 1955–56 national championship and three Copa del Generalísimo trophies, one of them conquered against Real Madrid at the Santiago Bernabéu Stadium, Garay signed for Barcelona for 5,5 million pesetas, a fee that would later be used to build the Mercy stand at San Mamés, dubbed by club fans Jesús Garay. He retired at the age of 35 after a further five seasons in the top division, four with the Catalans and one with CD Málaga, suffering relegation with the latter.

Garay died on 10 February 1995 at 64, in his hometown.

International career
Garay earned 29 caps for the Spanish national team for eight and a half years, making his debut on 19 March 1953 in a 3–1 friendly win against Belgium in Barcelona. He was part of the squad that competed at the 1962 FIFA World Cup, featuring in the 0–1 group stage loss to Czechoslovakia.

International goals

Honours
Athletic Bilbao
La Liga: 1955–56
Copa del Generalísimo: 1955, 1956, 1958
Copa Eva Duarte: 1950

Barcelona
Copa del Generalísimo: 1962–63

References

External links

FC Barcelona profile

1930 births
1995 deaths
Spanish footballers
Footballers from Bilbao
Association football defenders
La Liga players
Segunda División players
SD Erandio Club players
Athletic Bilbao footballers
FC Barcelona players
CD Málaga footballers
Spain B international footballers
Spain international footballers
1962 FIFA World Cup players